Dino Verzini (born 26 November 1943) is a retired Italian track cyclist who specialized in the sprint and tandem events. He was a national sprint champion in 1966 and 1968 and finished fifth at the 1968 Summer Olympics. In 1967 he won the tandem event at the national and World Championships, together with Bruno Gonzato; they also finished second at the 1969 Italian Championships.

After 1969, Verzini changed his tandem parterns several times, and at the 1972 Summer Olympics rode with Giorgio Rossi, finishing in ninth place.

After retiring from competitions Verzini founded the company Nuova Tandem, which makes welding and mechanical supplies for lift trucks. Verzini's father, Tullio Verzini, was also a cyclist and competed in the Giro d’Italia in 1926 and 1928–29.

References

1943 births
Living people
Olympic cyclists of Italy
Cyclists at the 1968 Summer Olympics
Cyclists at the 1972 Summer Olympics
Italian male cyclists
Cyclists from the Province of Verona